Mandalen is a river valley in Agder county, Norway. The river Mandalselva runs through the valley. The side valleys are Ljoslandsdalen and Lognadalen.

References

Valleys of Agder
Åseral
Lindesnes